= APO-Source =

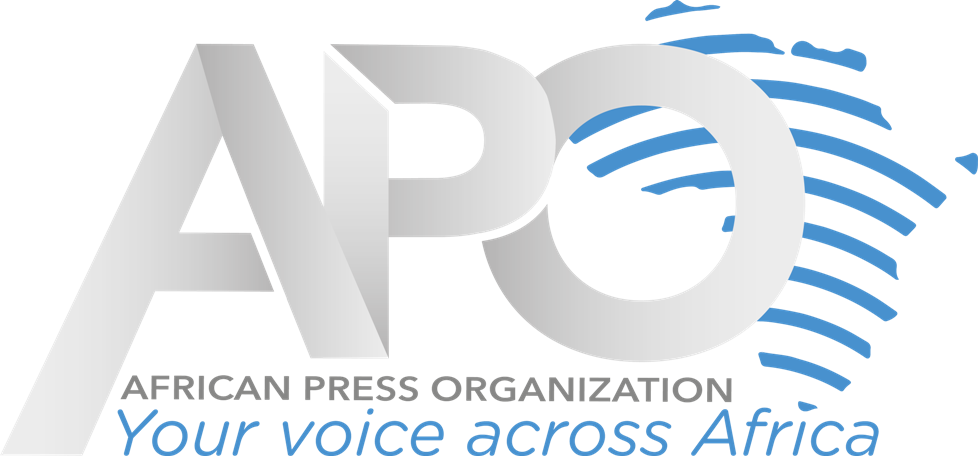
- Type: Online database of press releases related to Africa
- Format: Online
- Owner: African Press Organization
- Editor: African Press Organization
- Founded: October, 2007
- Headquarters: Dakar, Senegal
- Price: Free - Mailing list - RSS feed
- Website: APO-Source

APO-Source: The African News Source is an online database of news releases of the African Press Organization (APO). Started in 2007, APO-Source offers free access to tens of thousands of Africa-related news releases themed by country, industry and subject. In October 2015, it was replaced by Africa-Newsroom.com, though at least some new press releases were added until September 2022.
